Eric E. Whitaker (fl. 1987–2019) is an American physician.

Eric Whitaker or Whitacre may also refer to:

Eric P. Whitaker, American diplomat
Eric Whitaker (rugby union) (born 1966), American rugby union player; see 
Eric Whitacre (born 1970), American composer